Arturo Casco Hernández (March 17, 1961 – September 12, 2010) was a Mexican luchador, or professional wrestler, best known under the ring name La Fiera, which is Spanish for "The Wild Beast". Hernández was a second-generation wrestler, following in the footsteps of his father Hércules Poblano ("The Hercules from Puebla"). His brother wrestled as Ángel Poblano.

Professional wrestling career
Fiera held the NWA World Welterweight Championship from October 23, 1981 when he defeated Lizmark for the title until July 18, 1982 when he lost the championship to Américo Rocca. He would later hold the NWA World Middleweight Championship, defeating Gran Hamada on November 18, 1984, holding it until July 20, 1985 when he lost the belt to Chamaco Valaguez.

While his career slowed down by the 1990s due to age and injuries, he experienced a small comeback of sorts in 1996 when he teamed with Dos Caras and Héctor Garza to win the CMLL World Trios Championship from Bestia Salvaje, Emilio Charles, Jr. and Sangre Chicana.

The team was forced to vacate the title in 1997 when Héctor Garza left the promotion. La Fiera had been in semi-retirement since the early 2000s. During this final period of his career he wrestled only on a few select dates a year.

Death
Hernandez was heavily involved with drugs toward the end of his life, having previously served a prison sentence in the 90s for dealing them. On September 10, 2010, Hernandez was stabbed five times during a mugging by an unknown assailant, and died from his injuries two days later at a Mexico City hospital, at the age of 49. It is speculated that his drug involvement is what led to him being stabbed, but no certain reason was found and his killer was never found.

Championships and accomplishments
Empresa Mexicana de Lucha Libre
CMLL World Trios Championship (1 time) – with Dos Caras and Héctor Garza
NWA World Middleweight Championship (1 time)
NWA World Welterweight Championship (1 time)
Torneo de Trios (2001) – with Gigante Silva
Mexican local promotions
Puebla Lightweight Championship (1 time)

Luchas de Apuestas record

See also
 List of premature professional wrestling deaths

References

1961 births
2010 deaths
Deaths by stabbing in Mexico
Male murder victims
Mexican male professional wrestlers
Mexican murder victims
People murdered in Mexico
Place of death missing
Professional wrestlers from Puebla
People from Puebla (city)
20th-century professional wrestlers
21st-century professional wrestlers
CMLL World Trios Champions
NWA World Middleweight Champions
NWA World Welterweight Champions